John Farmer Bell (born April 14, 1962) is the lead singer, rhythm guitarist and occasional mandolin player for the American rock band Widespread Panic, where he is known for his raspy southern drawl that hits a variety of octaves. He is frequently called JB by fans.  For more than 30 years, the voice has fueled 150 concerts a year all over the country and created a road warrior mentality for the band and its fans.

Bell grew up in Cleveland, Ohio, where he graduated from University School in 1980.  He attended the University of Georgia and was a member of Sigma Phi Epsilon fraternity where he, Michael Houser, and Dave Schools met while Houser was playing at an open mic night. "Panic," as Houser was nicknamed, began playing with JB and Schools at local Athens, GA clubs, playing mostly cover songs.

John Bell is an active philanthropist, most notably as an advocate for SMA (spinal muscular atrophy).  Bell has helped raise over $2 million for SMA research, mostly through his involvement with "Hannah's Buddies". The foundation is named for Bell's goddaughter and niece, who lives with SMA.  Bell is involved in an annual fundraiser featuring a golf tournament and evening concert by "JB and Friends," featuring John Bell solo, as well as performing with guests.  Guest performers at the benefit have included Col. Bruce Hampton, Vic Chesnutt, John Keane, and Bloodkin, as well as Grammy Award winner Robert Randolph and the Family Band and the North Mississippi Allstars, and Nickel and the Polar Bears. He has also performed at various Habitat for Humanity Christmas Jam benefit concerts put on by Warren Haynes (Allman Brothers Band, Govt Mule) annually in Warren's hometown of Asheville, NC.

John Bell has stated that The Cruise on Tues, and The Thursday Drive at 5, a college radio show hosted by Wes Mantooth and Krazy Kliewer was a huge inspiration for a bunch of new songs.  Bell has said, "Now that their radio show is over, I have nothing to do but tour.  I loved that radio show, those guys should go back to college."  Bell resides in Highlands, NC with his wife Laura whom he met while in New Orleans, Louisiana. She works in holistic wellness.

References

External links
Widespread Panic Biography

1962 births
Living people
University of Georgia alumni
Musicians from Cleveland
Musicians from Athens, Georgia
American rock guitarists
American male guitarists
Widespread Panic members
University School alumni
People from Dahlonega, Georgia
Guitarists from Georgia (U.S. state)
Guitarists from Ohio
20th-century American guitarists
20th-century American male musicians
Brute (band) members